A Cadbury Snack is a shortcake biscuit square or two biscuits with chocolate filling, covered with  milk chocolate.

History
Three versions of Cadbury Snack are available in the United Kingdom and Ireland:  Snack Shortcake (chocolate-coated shortbread in a yellow wrapper), Snack Wafer (chocolate-covered wafer fingers in a pink wrapper) and Snack Sandwich, an individual chocolate-and-biscuit bar similar to the original Jacob's Club biscuit. In February 2015, Cadbury announced that it was ceasing production of the Snack Wafer due to declining sales.

During the 1970s there was a Cadbury Snack Finger (chocolate-covered fingers in a blue wrapper) see Cadbury Fingers & in the 2000s there were limited editions of other versions of Snack.

Advertising
During the 1950s and 1960s there were black-and-white television adverts for the Snack product. Colour ads appeared in the 1970s. In 1986 the television advert used the phrase "Bridge the Gap". There were cartoon adverts in the 1990s.

Australian version
It began production in 1974; before then, the chocolate was created by MacRobertson's. In June 2009, Cadbury reduced the size of the bars.

References

Chocolate bars
Snack
Mondelez International brands